Derek Francis Ryder (born 18 February 1947) is an English former professional footballer who played as a full back.

Career
Ryder began his career with his hometown club Leeds United but was released in 1966 after failing to break into the first team. He joined Cardiff City and, although he again struggled to establish himself, he made his professional debut in the Football League. He signed for Rochdale and went on to make over 150 appearances for the club, helping win promotion to the Third Division. He finished his professional career with Southport.

References

1947 births
Living people
English footballers
Footballers from Leeds
Leeds United F.C. players
Cardiff City F.C. players
Rochdale A.F.C. players
Southport F.C. players
English Football League players
Association football fullbacks